Nasrabad (also Romanized as Naşrābād) is a village in Zaz-e Sharqi Rural District, Zaz va Mahru District, Aligudarz County, Lorestan Province, Iran. At the 2006 census, its population was 148, in 23 families.

References 

Towns and villages in Aligudarz County